John W. Barfield (February 8 1927- January 2, 2018) in Tuscaloosa, Alabama) was an African American businessman who served in the U.S. Army in France and Germany  immediately after World War II. On his return, Barfield began working as a custodian for the University of Michigan and started his first business in 1955, called the Barfield Cleaning Company of Ypsilanti, Michigan, which employed 200 people. Barfield has since founded a $2B staffing business with 2,600 employees, which was named “Company of the Year” by the Black Enterprise magazine in 1985. Barfield is a recipient of the George Romney Award recognizing lifelong achievement in volunteerism. Barfield and his wife have six children and reside in Ann Arbor, Michigan.

The Bartech Group, which was founded by Barfield, is a workforce management and staff provider, headquartered in Livonia, Michigan, United States, with international operations in Mississauga, Ontario, Canada and the United Kingdom.

Barfield died of natural causes in his home in Ann Arbor on January 2, 2018.

References

People from Tuscaloosa, Alabama
African-American people
1927 births
2018 deaths
University of Michigan staff
American expatriates in France
American expatriates in Germany